Karl Gottfried Brunotte (born 2 June 1958 in Frankfurt) is a German composer and music philosopher, particularly noted for his contributions to church music.

Life 
Brunotte finished school in Bad Homburg (Kaiserin-Friedrich-Gymnasium). He studied music sociology, music psychology, ancient languages, aesthetics, piano, organ, harpsichord, violin, viola, recorder, singing, conducting, and musical composition, as well as electronic music, with (amongst others) Heinz Werner Zimmermann, Lothar Hoffmann-Erbrecht, Hans Peter Haller, Gottfried Michael Koenig, and Karlheinz Stockhausen.

From 1974 to 1977 he held the position of Cantor at the Christuskirche in Bad Homburg, where he later was a lecturer at the Hochschule für Musik und darstellende Kunst (1982–1985). From 1980 to 1986 he was Senior Lecturer at the International Vacation Courses for New Music in Darmstadt, and a member of the Darmstadt Institute for Music and Musical Education. In the 1984–85 year he was Rapporteur für Ernste Musik at the Landsmusikrat Hessen. Once a Jesuit novice, in 1987 he joined the Church of Jesus Christ of Latter-day Saints.

Since 1993 he has worked at the University of Frankfurt in the Institut für Musikwissenschaft und Musikpädagogik, as well as at the Fachhochschule Frankfurt für elektronische Musik.

He has composed nearly 300 pieces for the most diverse forces.

In addition to his compositional and teaching activities, Brunotte has been involved for decades in academic administration. In May 2012 he stood unsuccessfully against the incumbent, Hans-Eberhard Schurk, in the election for President of the Augsburg University of Applied Sciences.

Select list of compositions
 Apokrypta, for organ (1999)
 Dimensiones orbitalis IV, for harp (2006)
 Dunkelziffer, for maximum-range voice, percussion, and electronic sounds   (1997)
 Erdenlicht, in memoriam Marc Chagall, for flute, bassoon, and piano (with assistant)
 Hypotosis … selene …, for a clarinetist, a pianist/percussionist, and electronic sounds (1997)
 In aeternum II, for organ
 Intemporale, for clarinet, piano, and metronome
 Lehis Traum
 Mater dolorosa, for violin and piano
 Nachruf für Werner Heissenberg, electronic and concrete music
 Tangenten, for piano (1975)
 Ultravox I & III

References
  Cited in full in Anon. 1994a.
  [rev. Celestial symphonies and Ecce Homines.]
  [rev. Sieh meine Augen]
  [rev. Black and White Numerals and Epitaph for Brigham Young.]
  [rev. Agyara]
  [rev. Tombeau de Grieg]
  [rev. Tausend Sonnen]
  [rev. Auf der Galerie—Thema con variazioni]
  [rev. Ijob wächst Beckett]
  [rev. Lobpreis XJ]
  [rev. Mater dolorosa.]
  [rev. Cumorah carols.]
  [rev. Voca me cum benedictis.]
  [rev. Lehis Traum] 
 

Footnotes

External links
 The composer's own professional XING-profile: http://www.xing.com/profile/KarlGottfried_BrunOtte
 "Karl Gottfried Brunotte". Lothringer Verlag für Bühne und Musik (publisher’s website, accessed 18 February 2010)  
 Nordin, Ingvar Loco. "review of Nachruf für Werner Heissenberg (CD)". Sonoloco website (accessed 17 December 2013)
, world premiere from 2004, performed by Peter W. Schatt, clarinet, and Christian Nagel, piano and percussion (accessed 17 December 2013).

1958 births
Living people
German classical composers
20th-century classical composers
21st-century classical composers
Pupils of Karlheinz Stockhausen
German male classical composers
20th-century German composers
21st-century German composers
20th-century German male musicians
21st-century German male musicians
Academic staff of the Frankfurt University of Music and Performing Arts
Academic staff of the Frankfurt University of Applied Sciences